Ophirion is a genus of parasitic flies in the family Tachinidae.

Species
Ophirion atlixcoense (Reinhard, 1975)
Ophirion brasiliensis (Townsend, 1927)
Ophirion flava (Townsend, 1919)
Ophirion mirabile Townsend, 1911
Ophirion polybia (Curran, 1937)
Ophirion punctigerum (Townsend, 1927)
Ophirion tersum (Townsend, 1919)

References

Exoristinae
Diptera of North America
Diptera of South America
Tachinidae genera
Taxa named by Charles Henry Tyler Townsend